Pierre Bouet (born 19 July 1937 in Caen) is a 20th-century French historian specializing in Norman and Anglo-Norman historians of Latin language (tenth-twelfth centuries).

Works 
 
 
 
Works in collaboration:

External links 
 Robert de Torigni (vers 1142/1180) by Pierre Bouet
 Bibliographie de Pierre Bouet by François Neveux on  Persée
 "Hastings 14 octobre 1066" video

1937 births
Living people
20th-century French historians
French medievalists
Academic staff of the University of Caen Normandy